Jan Kanty Steczkowski (16 October 1862, Dąbrowa Tarnowska – 3 September 1929, Kraków) was a Polish economist, solicitor and politician.

Steczkowski served as Minister of Finance of Poland in the government of Jan Kucharzewski. On 4 April 1918, the Regency Council set up a government in which he became the Prime Minister. His government only lasted until 23 October.

Steczkowski returned to politics in the government of Wincenty Witos (1920–1921), once again leading the Ministry of Finance. Later he was the director of the Bank Gospodarstwa Krajowego (replaced in 1927).

References

1862 births
1929 deaths
People from Dąbrowa Tarnowska
People from the Kingdom of Galicia and Lodomeria
Polish Austro-Hungarians
Prime Ministers of Poland
Finance Ministers of Poland
People of the Kingdom of Poland (1917–1918)